Christian liturgy is a pattern for worship used (whether recommended or prescribed) by a Christian congregation or denomination on a regular basis. The term liturgy comes from Greek and means "public work". Within Christianity, liturgies descending from the same region, denomination, or culture are described as ritual families.

The majority of Christian denominations hold church services on the Lord's Day (with many offering Sunday morning and Sunday evening services); a number of traditions have mid-week Wednesday evening services as well. In some Christian denominations, liturgies are held daily, with these including those in which the canonical hours are prayed, as well as the offering of the Eucharistic liturgies such as Mass, among other forms of worship. In addition to this, many Christians attend services of worship on holy days such as Christmas, Ash Wednesday, Good Friday, Ascension Thursday, among others depending on the Christian denomination.

In most Christian traditions, liturgies are presided over by clergy wherever possible.

History
The holding of church services pertains to the observance of the Lord's Day in Christianity. The Bible has a precedent for a pattern of morning and evening worship that has given rise to Sunday morning and Sunday evening services of worship held in the churches of many Christian denominations today, a "structure to help families sanctify the Lord’s Day." In Psalm 92, which is a prayer concerning the observance of the Sabbath, the prophet David writes "It is good to give thanks to the Lord, to sing praises to your name, O Most High; to declare your steadfast love in the morning, and your faithfulness by night" (cf.  ). Church father Eusebius of Caesarea thus declared: "For it is surely no small sign of God’s power that throughout the whole world in the churches of God at the morning rising of the sun and at the evening hours, hymns, praises, and truly divine delights are offered to God. God’s delights are indeed the hymns sent up everywhere on earth in his Church at the times of morning and evening."

Types

Communion liturgies
The Catholic Mass is the service in which the Eucharist is celebrated. In Latin, the corresponding word is Missa, taken from the dismissal at the end of the liturgy - Ite, Missa est, literally "Go, it is the dismissal", translated idiomatically in the current English Roman Missal as "Go forth, the Mass is ended." Eastern Orthodox and Oriental Orthodox Churches call this service the Divine Liturgy. The descendant Churches of the Church of the East and various other Syriac Churches call their Liturgy the Holy Qurbana - Holy Offering. Anglicans often use the Roman Catholic term mass, or simply Holy Eucharist. Mass is the common term used in the Lutheran Church in Europe but more often referred to as the Divine Service, Holy Communion, or the Holy Eucharist in North American Lutheranism. The Byzantine Rite uses the term "Divine Liturgy" to denote the Eucharistic service.

Lutherans retained and utilized much of the Roman Catholic mass since the early modifications by Martin Luther. The general order of the mass and many of the various aspects remain similar between the two traditions. Latin titles for the sections, psalms, and days has been widely retained, but more recent reforms have omitted this. Recently, Lutherans have adapted much of their revised mass to coincide with the reforms and language changes brought about by post-Vatican II changes.

Protestant traditions vary in their liturgies or "orders of worship" (as they are commonly called). Other traditions in the west often called "Mainline" have benefited from the Liturgical Movement which flowered in the mid/late 20th century. Over the course of the past several decades, these Protestant traditions have developed remarkably similar patterns of liturgy, drawing from ancient sources as the paradigm for developing proper liturgical expressions. Of great importance to these traditions has been a recovery of a unified pattern of Word and Sacrament in Lord's Day liturgy.

Many other Protestant Christian traditions (such as the Pentecostal/Charismatics, Assembly of God, and Non-denominational churches), while often following a fixed "order of worship", tend to have liturgical practices that vary from that of the broader Christian tradition.

Divine office
The term "Divine Office" describes the practice of "marking the hours of each day and sanctifying the day with prayer". 

In the Western Catholic Church, there are multiple forms of the office. The Liturgy of the Hours is the official form of the office used throughout the Latin Church, but many other forms exist including the Little Office of the Blessed Virgin Mary, the forms of the office specific to various religious orders, and the Roman Breviary which was Standard before the Second Vatican Council, to name a few. There were eight such hours, corresponding to certain times of the day: Matins (sometimes called Vigil), Lauds, Prime, Terce, Sext, None, Vespers, and Compline. The Second Vatican Council ordered the suppression of Prime.

In monasteries, Matins was generally celebrated before dawn, or sometimes over the course of a night; Lauds at the end of Matins, generally at the break of day; Prime at 6 AM; Terce at 9AM; Sext at noon; None at 3PM; Vespers at the rising of the Vespers or Evening Star (usually about 6PM); and Compline was said at the end of the day, generally right before bed time.

In Anglican churches, the offices were combined into two offices: Morning Prayer and Evening Prayer, the latter sometimes known as Evensong. In more recent years, the Anglicans have added the offices of Noonday and Compline to Morning and Evening Prayer as part of the Book of Common Prayer. The Anglican Breviary, containing 8 full offices, is not the official liturgy of the Anglican Church.

In Lutheranism, like Anglicanism, the offices were also combined into the two offices of Matins and Vespers (both of which are still maintained in modern Lutheran prayer books and hymnals). A common practice among Lutherans in America is to pray these offices mid-week during Advent and Lent. The office of Compline is also found in some older Lutheran worship books and more typically used in monasteries and seminaries.

The Byzantine Rite maintains a daily cycle of seven non-sacramental services:
 Vespers (Gk. Hesperinos) at sunset commences the liturgical day
 Compline (Gk. Apodeipnou, "after supper")
 Midnight Office (Gk. mesonyktikon)
 Matins (Gk. Orthros), ending at dawn (in theory; in practice, the time varies greatly)
 The First Hour
 The Third and Sixth Hours
 The Ninth Hour
The sundry Canonical Hours are, in practice, grouped together into aggregates so that there are three major times of prayer a day: Evening, Morning and Midday; for details, see Canonical hours — Aggregates.

Great Vespers as it is termed in the Byzantine Rite, is an extended vespers service used on the eve of a major Feast day, or in conjunction with the divine liturgy, or certain other special occasions.

Commonalities
There are common elements found in most Western liturgical churches which predate the Protestant Reformation. These include:
The Procession with the cross, followed by the other acolytes, the deacons and the priest
The Invocation (beginning with the Sign of the Cross)
Confession at the foot of the altar
Absolution
Introit, Psalms, Hymns, chants
Litany
Kyrie and Gloria
Salutation
Collect
Liturgical Readings (call and response)
Alleluia Verse and other responses

Scripture readings, culminating in a reading from one of the Gospels.
The Creed
The Prayers
The Lord's Prayer
Commemoration of the Saints and prayers for the faithful departed.
Intercessory prayers for the church and its leadership, and often, for earthly rulers.
Incense
Offering
A division between the first half of the liturgy, open to both Church members and those wanting to learn about the church, and the second half, the celebration of the Eucharist proper, open only to baptized believers in good standing with the church.
 The Consecration
 The Offertory Prayer
Communion
Sanctus prayer as part of the anaphora
A three-fold dialogue between priest and people at the beginning of the anaphora or eucharistic prayer
An anaphora, eucharistic canon, "great thanksgiving", canon or "hallowing", said by the priest in the name of all present, in order to consecrate the bread and wine as the Body and Blood of Christ.
A prayer to God the Father, usually invoking the Holy Spirit, asking that the bread and wine become, or be manifested as, the body and blood of Christ.
Expressions within the anaphora which indicate that sacrifice is being offered in remembrance of Christ's crucifixion.
A section of the anaphora which asks that those who receive communion may be blessed thereby, and often, that they may be preserved in the faith until the end of their lives
The Peace or "Passing of the Peace"
Agnus Dei
Benediction

Partial list of Christian liturgical rites
Different Christian traditions have employed different rites:

Western Christian churches

Catholic Church (Western)

Roman Rite, in which the historical forms of the Mass are usually classified as follows:
Pre-Tridentine Mass (the various pre-1570 forms)
The Tridentine Mass (1570–1969), the 1962 version of which is still permitted as an extraordinary form of the Roman Rite as confirmed by Summorum Pontificum
The Mass of Paul VI, since 1970 the ordinary form of the Roman Rite (1970–present)
Anglican Use, (in personal ordinariates and Anglican Use parishes)
Ambrosian Rite (in Milan, Italy and neighbouring areas)
Aquileian Rite (defunct: northeastern Italy)
Rite of Braga (in Braga, Portugal)
Durham Rite (defunct: Durham, England)
Gallican Rite (defunct: 'Gaul' i.e. France)
Mozarabic Rite (in Toledo and Salamanca, Spain)
Celtic Rite (defunct: British Isles)
Sarum Rite (defunct: England)
Catholic Order Rites (generally defunct)
 Benedictine Rite
 Carmelite Rite
 Carthusian Rite
 Cistercian Rite
 Dominican Rite
 Norbertine Rite

Protestant churches
Historic Protestant Churches have set liturgies, which are referred to as "worship services" or "divine services".

Reformed churches

Protestant Reformation-era ministers of the Reformed tradition used set liturgies which emphasized preaching and the Bible. English Puritans and separatists moved away from set forms in the 17th-century, but many Reformed churches retained liturgies and continue to use them today.

Lutheran churches
Church of Denmark
Church of Norway
Church of Sweden
Church of Finland
Evangelical Church of the Augsburg Confession in Slovakia
Slovak Evangelical Church of the Augsburg Confession in Serbia
Evangelical Lutheran Church in America
Evangelical Lutheran Church in Canada
Lutheran Church–Missouri Synod
Wisconsin Evangelical Lutheran Synod
Divine Service

Anglican Communion
At the time of English Reformation, The Sarum Rite was in use along with the Roman Rite. Reformers in England wanted the Latin mass translated into the English language. Archbishop of Canterbury Thomas Cranmer authored the Exhortation and Litany in 1544. This was the earliest English-language service book of the Church of England, and the only English-language service to be finished within the lifetime of King Henry VIII. In 1549, Cranmer produced a complete English-language liturgy. Cranmer was largely responsible for the first two editions of the Book of Common Prayer. The first edition was predominantly pre-Reformation in its outlook. The Communion Service, Lectionary, and collects in the liturgy were translations based on the Sarum Rite as practised in Salisbury Cathedral.

The revised edition in 1552 sought to assert a more clearly Protestant liturgy after problems arose from conservative interpretation of the mass on the one hand, and a critique by Martin Bucer (Butzer) on the other. Successive revisions are based on this edition, though important alterations appeared in 1604 and 1662. The 1662 edition is still authoritative in the Church of England and has served as the basis for many of Books of Common Prayer of national Anglican churches around the world. Those deriving from Scottish Episcopal descent, like the Prayer Books of the American Episcopal Church, have a slightly different liturgical pedigree.

Methodist churches
The Methodist liturgical tradition is based on the Anglican heritage and was passed along to Methodists by John Wesley (an Anglican priest who led the early Methodist movement) who wrote that  
When the Methodists in America were separated from the Church of England, John Wesley himself provided a revised version of the Book of Common Prayer called The Sunday Service of the Methodists. Wesley's Sunday Service has shaped the official liturgies of the Methodists ever since.

The United Methodist Church has official liturgies for services of Holy Communion, baptism, weddings, funerals, ordination, anointing of the sick for healing, and daily office "praise and prayer" services. Along with these, there are also special services for holy days such as All Saints Day, Ash Wednesday, Maundy Thursday, Good Friday, and Easter Vigil. All of these liturgies and services are contained in The United Methodist Hymnal and The United Methodist Book of Worship (1992). Many of these liturgies are derived from the Anglican tradition's Book of Common Prayer. In most cases, congregations also use other elements of liturgical worship, such as candles, vestments, paraments, banners, and liturgical art.

Because John Wesley advocated outdoor evangelism, revival services are a traditional worship practice of Methodism that are often held in local churches, as well as at outdoor camp meetings, brush arbour revivals, and at tent revivals.

United and Uniting churches

Church of South India
The liturgy of the Church of South India combines many traditions, including that of the Methodists and such smaller churches as the Church of the Brethren and the Disciples of Christ. After the formation of the Church of South India the first synod met at Madurai in March 1948 and appointed a liturgical committee. The first Synod in 1948 (where the Holy Communion service was that of the Presbyterian Church of Scotland) appointed a liturgy committee, composed mainly of Western theologians. The liturgy so prepared was first used at the Synod Session in 1950 and approved for use throughout the church "wherever it is desired" in 1954. The first version of the Confirmation Service for the new church was also released in 1950, translated into regional languages and was quickly adopted by the various dioceses.

By 1962 the Liturgy Committee was able to prepare a number of Orders. They were Eucharist, Morning and Evening Prayer, Marriage Service, Burial Service, Ordination Service and Covenant Service (1954), Holy Baptism (1955) and Almanac (1955–56). The Book of Common Worship of the CSI was published in 1963 with all the above orders of service. The orders of service consist of: Order for Morning and Evening Worship, Order of Service for the Baptized Persons, Order for Holy Baptism, Order for the Churching of Women, Order for Holy Matrimony, Order for the Burial Service, Order for the Covenant Service, Order for Ordination Services.

The CSI liturgy was again revised in the year 2004 and published as a hardback book in 2006.

The CSI Synod Liturgical Committee has developed several new orders for worship for different occasions. The order for the Communion Service, known as the CSI Liturgy, has been internationally acclaimed as an important model for new liturgies. The Committee has also produced three different cycles of lectionaries for daily Bible readings and "propers", and collects for Communion services. In addition, the Committee has also brought out a Supplement to the Book of Common Worship.

Eastern Christian churches

Eastern Orthodox Church
Liturgy of St. James (Byzantine Rite)
Liturgy of St Basil (Byzantine Rite)
Liturgy of St John Chrysostom (Byzantine Rite)
Liturgy of the Presanctified Gifts (Byzantine Rite)
Western Rites
 Numerous; see Western Rites in Orthodox

Oriental Orthodox Churches
Liturgy of St. James (West Syriac Rite)
Liturgy of St. Cyril, also known as Liturgy of St. Mark (Alexandrian Rite)
Liturgy of St. Basil the Great (Alexandrian & Armenian Rites)
Liturgy of St. Gregory the Theologian (Alexandrian Rite)
Liturgy of St. Gregory the Illuminator (Armenian Rite)

Assyrian Church of the East
Liturgy of Addai and Mari (East Syriac Rite)
The Hallowing of Nestorius (East Syriac Rite) 
The Hallowing of Theodore of Mopsuestia (East Syriac Rite)

The Eastern Catholic Churches

Alexandrian liturgical tradition; 2 rites
Coptic Rite
Ethiopic Rite
Antiochian (Antiochene or West-Syriac) liturgical tradition; 3 rites
(West) Syriac Rite
Maronite Rite
Syro-Malankara Rite
Armenian Rite; 1 rite
East Syriac or Chaldean liturgical tradition; 2 rites
Chaldean Rite
Syro-Malabar Rite
Byzantine (Constantinopolitan) liturgical tradition (very uniform except in language); 14 rites
Albanian, Belarusian, Bulgarian, Croatian, Greek, Hungarian, Italo-Albanian, Macedonian, Melkite, Romanian, Russian, Ruthenian, Slovak, Ukrainian Rite

See also

 Anglican devotions
 Apostolic Tradition
 List of Catholic rites and churches

Notes

References

Further reading
 Reed, Luther D. (1947) The Lutheran Liturgy: a Study [especially] of the Common Service of the Lutheran Church in America. Philadelphia, Penn.: Muhlenberg Press. N.B.: This study also includes some coverage of other Lutheran liturgical services, especially of Matins and Vespers

External links

 

 
Religious language
Christian genres